This is a list of Conservative Party Members of Parliament (MPs) elected to the British House of Commons for the 43rd Parliament of the United Kingdom. This includes MPs elected at the 2005 general election and those subsequently elected in by-elections.

The names in italics are those who did not serve throughout this Parliament and the names with a * next to them are MPs who first entered Parliament in a by-election.

 MPs 

By-elections

See also

 Results of the 2005 United Kingdom general election
 List of MPs elected in the 2005 United Kingdom general election
 Members of the House of Lords
 List of United Kingdom Labour MPs 2005-
 List of United Kingdom Labour Co-operative MPs 2005-
 List of United Kingdom Labour and Labour Co-operative MPs 2005-
 List of United Kingdom Liberal Democrat MPs 2005-
 List of MPs for English constituencies 2005-2010
 List of MPs for Scottish constituencies 2005-
 List of MPs for Welsh constituencies 2005-
 List of MPs for Northern Irish constituencies 2005-
 :Category:UK MPs 2005-2010

2005-2010
Conservative